Clifford  Ellsworth "Biff" Hoffman (1904 – January 29, 1954) was an American football player.

Early life
Hoffman attended Petaluma High School in Petaluma, California, and then went on to attend Stanford University.

Track and field
At Stanford, Hoffman was on the track and field team, where he threw the discus.

Stanford football
Hoffman was also a fullback on Stanford's football team under legendary coach Pop Warner. The 1926 Stanford football team went undefeated in the regular season, outscoring its opponents 268–73, and then faced also-undefeated Alabama in the 1927 Rose Bowl. The teams played to a 7–7 tie and were named co-national champions by most media. In 1927, Hoffman was named team captain and helped lead the team to the 1928 Rose Bowl, facing the Pitt Panthers. Behind 6–0 in the third quarter, Hoffman caught a screen pass and raced toward the end zone, but fumbled short of the goal line; another Stanford player, Frankie Wilton, picked up the fumble and ran the ball in for the touchdown. Hoffman then kicked the extra point and the score held, giving Stanford a 7–6 victory, its first Rose Bowl win in four attempts. Hoffman was retroactively named the game's most outstanding player when the award was created in 1954.

After football
In 1930, Hoffman married fellow Stanford graduate Claire Giannini, daughter of Bank of America founder Amadeo Giannini. Hoffman worked as an investment banker in San Francisco, and died in 1954 of complications related to an ulcer in his esophagus.

References

1954 deaths
Stanford Cardinal football players
Players of American football from San Francisco
1904 births